Spencer Jones (born 17 July 1997) is a Canadian rugby union player, currently playing for the Toronto Arrows of Major League Rugby (MLR) and the Canadian national team. His preferred position is centre.

Professional career
Jones signed for Major League Rugby side Toronto Arrows for the 2021 Major League Rugby season, having previously represented the side in both 2019 and 2020. Jones made his debut for Canada in the 2023 Rugby World Cup Qualifiers.

References

External links
itsrugby.co.uk Profile

1997 births
Living people
Canadian rugby union players
Canada international rugby union players
Rugby union centres
Sportspeople from Vancouver
Rugby union fly-halves
Toronto Arrows players
New England Free Jacks players